New Tech High @ Coppell (NTH@C) is a secondary high school located in Coppell, Texas, United States, a suburb of Dallas. It is the second high school in the Coppell Independent School District. It is part of the New Tech Network which nationwide has 86 "New Tech" schools. The school had its first senior class in 2011 and has a current enrollment of 382 students with 33 staff members. The school is also toured often by school districts and politicians interested in New Tech. It also has the shortest elapsed time in between when it starts and ends.

Demographics 
As of the 2022-2023 school year, the student population is made up of the following ethnicities out of 382 students

Demographics for the 2022-2023 school year

Campus 
New Tech High School at Coppell is located at the former Lee Elementary School, which closed in June 2008. The school district plans to build a new campus for the high school near North Lake, Texas.

Student Activities

Clubs  
Art Club, Basketball Club, DECA, One Earth, First Tech Challenge, Mu Alpha Theta, and Model United Nations.

Student Leadership  
National Honor Society, Networking Team Captain (NTC), and Learner Leadership Council (LLC).

References

External links
 

Educational institutions established in 2008
2008 establishments in Texas
Public high schools in Dallas County, Texas
Coppell, Texas